Rifftera is a Finnish metal band formed in Vaasa in 2010. Their music is influenced especially by melodic death metal and thrash metal. Rifftera's debut album Pitch Black was released in 2015 and reached position 37 in The Official Finnish Charts.

Members

Lineup 
 Janne Hietala – guitar, harsh vocals (2010-)
 Mikko Kuoppamaa – guitar, clean vocals (2012-)
 Antti Pöntinen – keyboards (2010-)
 Jupe Karhu – bass (2010-)
 Ville Härkönen - drums (2016-)

Session members 
 Thomas Tunkkari - drums (Pitch Black, 2015)

Discography 
 Pitch Black (2015)
 Across the Acheron (2019)

References

External links 
 Official website
 Rifftera at YouTube
 Rifftera at Encyclopaedia Metallum

Finnish melodic death metal musical groups
Finnish thrash metal musical groups
Musical groups established in 2010
2010 establishments in Finland